Samuel Edward Konkin III (8 July 1947 – 23 February 2004), also known as SEK3, was a Canadian-American left-libertarian philosopher and Austrian school economist. As the author of the publication New Libertarian Manifesto, he was a proponent of a political philosophy he named agorism.

Personal life 
Konkin was born in Edmonton, Alberta, to Samuel Edward Konkin II and Helen Konkin. He had one brother named Alan. He married Sheila Wymer in 1990 and had one son named Samuel Evans-Konkin. The marriage ended soon afterward. Although he was an atheist, Konkin was a lifelong fan of C. S. Lewis and J. R. R. Tolkien.

Konkin was also notable for his style of dress: "To show his anarchist beliefs, he dressed completely in black, a color associated with that movement since the late nineteenth century".

On 23 February 2004, Konkin died of natural causes in his apartment in West Los Angeles, California. He was buried alongside his father in Edmonton, Alberta.

Political opinions 

Konkin considered libertarianism radical. He was an initiator of the Agorist Institute.

Konkin rejected voting, believing it to be inconsistent with libertarian ethics. He likewise opposed involvement with the Libertarian Party, which he regarded as a statist co-option of libertarianism. He was an opponent of influential minarchist philosopher Robert Nozick, and referred to Nozick's devotees as "Nozis".

Konkin presents his strategy for achieving a libertarian society in his aforementioned manifesto. Since he rejected voting and other means by which people typically attempt social change, he encouraged people to withdraw their consent from the state by devoting their economic activities to black market and grey market sources, which would not be taxed or regulated. Konkin called "transactions on these markets, as well as other activities that bypassed the State, 'counter-economics.' Peaceful transactions take place in a free market, or agora: hence his term 'agorism' for the society he sought to achieve." He also strongly opposed the idea of intellectual property.

Konkin was editor and publisher of the irregularly-produced New Libertarian Notes (1971–1975), the New Libertarian Weekly (1975–1978), and finally New Libertarian magazine (1978–1990), the last issue of which was a special science fiction tribute featuring a Robert A. Heinlein cover (issue 187, 1990).

Konkin was an opponent of imperialism and interventionism.

Controversies 
In her book Anarchism: Left, Right, and Green, political theorist and anarcho-syndicalist, Ulrike Heider accused Konkin of endorsing historical negationism in his dealing with the Institute for Historical Review, where he served on the Board of Directors, which included allotting advertisement space to the IHR in New Libertarian, and writing a positive review of James J. Martin's book on Raphael Lemkin, which was published by the IHR. Konkin personally rejected Holocaust denial, but defended the IHR because he believed its freedom of speech was being suppressed. However, Konkin's appraisal of Martin's book, specifically the second chapter (in which Martin labelled the claims of the mass murder of Jews as "a well coordinated and orchestrated propaganda assault") as "a summary of Martin's libertarian-revisionist views of the Second World War" and "the highlight of the book and a valuable booklet on its own" for "the libertarian and the hard-core revisionist", calls that framing into question.

See also 
 Economic secession
 Victor Koman
 J. Neil Schulman

References

External links 
 Agorism.eu.org has archived Konkin writings and pamphlets in PDF format
 Collected writings of Samuel Edward Konkin III
 Fanzines by SEK3
 Interview with Konkin
 Konkin on Libertarian Strategy, by Murray Rothbard
 Sam Konkin and Libertarian Theory, by David Gordon
 KoPubCo back issues of New Libertarian
 Murray Rothbard, "Konkin on Libertarian Strategy" followed by Samuel E. Konkin, "Reply to Rothbard" at AnthonyFlood.com
 Obituary for SEK3 by Jeff Riggenbach
 Obituary for Sam Konkin by Phil Osborn

1947 births
2004 deaths
20th-century American male writers
20th-century American non-fiction writers
21st-century American male writers
21st-century American non-fiction writers
Agorists
American atheists
American economics writers
American libertarians
American male non-fiction writers
American political philosophers
American political writers
American revolutionaries
Anarchist theorists
Anarchist writers
Free-market anarchists
Left-libertarians
Libertarian theorists
Non-interventionism
Philosophy writers
Revolution theorists
Writers from Edmonton